Hwang or Whang (or in some cases, Whong) is a Korean family name. Today, Hwangs comprise approximately 1.4% of the Korean population. The South Korean census in the year 2000 found that there were 644,294 Hwangs with over 68 Bon-gwan family clans, making it the 16th most common last name in the country. Also, it is estimated that there are over 29,410,000 individuals whose last names are the variations of Huang, including the Korean Hwang and the Vietnamese Hoang around the world. The Chinese character, or Hanja, for Hwang indicates "yellow" or “Huang Kingdom”.

Bon-gwan 

In the traditional Korean clan system, which remains as the basis of the family registry system in South Korea, each clan is distinguished by its bon-gwan (본관,本貫). Each bon-gwan in Korea originates from the clan progenitor's settlement, which can be explained as the traditional home of the family clan's first male ancestor. Typically in Korea, a last name includes many distinct bon-gwans, which leads to the last name becoming a broad umbrella designation that involves numerous family clans. Therefore, individuals with Korean descent may be completely unrelated even if their last names are identical, depending on their family clan, or bon-gwan. In the Korean language, Bon-gwans are expressed before the family name when necessary and often involves the family progenitor's first settlement as the name of the bon-gwan. The last name is referred to as the Ssi (씨-氏) in Korean. This arranges every Korean family clan name as bon-gwan ssi, or in other words, family clan - last name.

History 
The Korean Hwang surname originates from a Chinese Han Dynasty's diplomatic ambassador to Vietnam, named Hwang Rak (황락,黃洛). Hwang Rak is recorded in AD 28 as having become lost at sea during a voyage from China to Vietnam, and instead having arrived in Korea during the Silla Dynasty. Hwang Rak arrived at a place in Korea called Pyeong-Hae (평해,平海), located in the Eastern province of GyeongSang-BukDo, as currently known in South Korea. Upon settling in Pyeong-Hae, Hwang Rak naturalized as a Silla citizen and became the first progenitor of the last name Hwang (황) in Korea. His grave is located at GulMi-Bong (봉, 峰, peak), 423-8 BunJi, Wolsong-Ri, PyeongHae-Eub, WolJin-Kun, KyeongSang-BukDo, Republic of Korea, but only the altar of the grave remains as a marker.

Before his death, Hwang-Rak had three sons named Gab-Go (갑고,甲古), Eul-Go (을고,乙古), and Byung-Go (丙古), from eldest to youngest. Gab-Go, the oldest son, is recorded as having remained in Pyeong-Hae, continuing the main Pyeong-Hae family clan. The second son, Eul-Go, is said to have left home Westwards and eventually settled in Jang-Su, becoming the first progenitor of the Jang-Su Hwang family clan. The third and youngest son, Byung-Go, is said to have settled in Chang-Won, becoming the first progenitor of the Chang-Won Hwang family clan. These migrations of the two sons have resulted in the three major Bon-gwans being created under the Hwang family name.

Notable clans 
 Changwon Hwang clan - 252,814 members.
 Jangsu Hwang clan - 146,575 members.
 Pyeonghae Hwang clan - 137,150 members.
 Hoideok Hwang clan - 7,393 members.
 Sangju Hwang clan - 7,031 members.
 Deoksan Hwang clan - 3,364 members.
 Jaeahn Hwang clan - 2,752 members.
 Hangjoo Hwang clan - 402 members.
All figures are from the 2000 South Korean census. 

To this day, the three primary branches of the Hwang family are the Chang-Won (창원황씨,昌原黃氏), Jang-Su (장수황씨,張水黃氏), and Pyeonghae (평해황씨,平海黃氏) clans, with the largest member counts of the 55 Hwang clans.

Notable people 
 Hwang Bo-reum-byeol — South Korean actress and model
 Hwang Chan-sung — South Korean singer and actor, member of boy band 2PM
 Hwang Chi-yeul — South Korean singer
 Hwang Dae-heon — South Korean short track speed skater
 David Henry Hwang — American playwright, librettist, screenwriter, and theater professor
 Dennis Hwang – American-born South Korean graphic artist
 Hwang Dong-hyuk – South Korean director, screenwriter and producer
 Hwang Eun-bi (stage name SinB) — South Korean singer, former member of girl group GFriend
 Harold Y. Hwang — American physicist
 Hwang Hee-chan — South Korean football player
 Hwang Hui — 14th-century royal prime minister (영의정, 領議政) during the rule of Taejong and Sejong the Great of the Joseon Dynasty
 Hwang In-beom — South Korean football player
 Hwang In-youp — South Korean actor, model and singer
 Hwang Jae-hun – South Korean football player
 Hwang Jang-lee — Japanese-born Korean martial artist and film actor
 Hwang Jang-yop — former North Korean politician and North Korean defector to South Korea
 Hwang Jini — legendary gisaeng of the Joseon Dynasty
 Hwang Jin-Woo – South Korean auto racing driver
 Hwang Jung-eum — South Korean actress and singer
 Hwang Jung-eun — South Korean writer and podcaster
 Hwang Jung-Oh — South Korean judoka
 Jun-Muk Hwang — South Korean mathematician
 Hwang Jun-seok — South Korean engineer
 Hwang Kwang Hee — South Korean singer
 Hwang Kyo-ahn — South Korean politician and prosecutor, 40th Prime Minister of South Korea
 Hwang Hyo-sook (stage name Lexy) — South Korean singer
 Hwang Min-hyun — South Korean singer, member of boy band NU'EST and a former member of boy band Wanna One
 Serra Miyeun Hwang — Korean-American composer
 Hwang Seung-eon — South Korean actress, model and singer
 Hwang Sok-yong — South Korean author
 Hwang Sun-hong — South Korean football player
 Hwang Sun-hee — South Korean actress
 Hwang Sun-won — South Korean author and defining figure of modern Korean literature
 Tiffany Hwang — Korean-American singer-songwriter, member of girl group Girls' Generation
 Hwang Young-min (known as Tim) – Korean-American singer
 Hwang Ui-jo — South Korean football player
 Hwang Woo-Suk — discredited South Korean biomedical scientist
 Hwang Young-Cho — South Korean athlete
 Hwang Yu-mi — South Korean badminton player

Fictional characters
 Hwang Seong-gyeong — a recurring video game character who first appeared in Soul Edge

See also
 List of Korean family names
 Korean name
 Korean culture
 Korean language

References

Korean-language surnames